The Book of Expletives written by Wang Yinzhi is a book in ten volumes that analyzes the function of words in classical Chinese texts.

Background 
Modern Chinese and Classical Chinese are distinctly different. Even though some of the writing may be the same, grammar, sentence structure and meanings of words in their cultural context changed over time and may make Chinese classics difficult if not impossible to understand. The Book of Expletives serves as an interpretation of classical Chinese texts in modern terms.

References 

Chinese language
Chinese classic texts
Standard Chinese